Carlos Alberto Tabares Padilla (born July 8, 1974, in Habana Vieja) is a center fielder for Industriales of the Cuban National Series. He has also been a frequent member of the Cuban national baseball team, including appearances at the 2006 World Baseball Classic and the 2004 Summer Olympics.

Tabares batted .314 during the 2005-06 Cuban National Series, with nine home runs in the 90-game season.

References

External links
 

1974 births
Living people
Baseball players from Havana
Olympic gold medalists for Cuba
Olympic baseball players of Cuba
Olympic medalists in baseball
Medalists at the 2004 Summer Olympics
Baseball players at the 2004 Summer Olympics
Pan American Games gold medalists for Cuba
Baseball players at the 2003 Pan American Games
2006 World Baseball Classic players
Pan American Games medalists in baseball
Central American and Caribbean Games gold medalists for Cuba
Competitors at the 1998 Central American and Caribbean Games
Central American and Caribbean Games medalists in baseball
Medalists at the 2003 Pan American Games